The 2011 UEFA European Under-19 Championship was the tenth edition of UEFA's European Under-19 Championship since it was renamed from the original under-18 event, in 2001. The tournament took place in Romania from 20 July to 1 August 2011. France were the title holders, but failed to qualify for the finals. Spain won the tournament.

Qualification 

Qualification for the final tournament was played over two stages:
 Qualification – 28 September 2010 – 30 October 2010
 Elite qualification – 28 April 2011 – 5 June 2011

The final tournament of the Championship was preceded by two qualification stages: a qualifying round and an Elite round. During these rounds, 52 national teams competed to determine the seven teams that would join the already qualified host nation Romania.

The qualifying round was played between 28 September and 30 October 2010. The 52 teams were divided into 13 groups of four teams, with each group being contested as a mini-tournament hosted by one of the group's teams. After all matches were played, the 13 group winners and 13 group runners-up advanced to the Elite round. Alongside the 26 winner and runner-up teams, the two best third-placed teams also qualified.

The following teams qualified for the tournament
 
 
 
 
  (host)

Squads

Venues
The tournament venues will all be located in Ilfov County, near the capital Bucharest, at already existing stadiums in four locations (one town and three communes).

Group stage 
The draw was held in Bucharest on 8 June 2011, when hosts Romania and the seven elite-round qualifiers divided into two groups of four.

Each group winner and runner-up advanced to the semi-finals.

Tie-break criteria for teams even on points:
Higher number of points obtained in the group matches played among the teams in question
Superior goal difference resulting from the group matches played among the teams in question
Higher number of goals scored in the group matches played among the teams in question
If, after having applied the above criteria, two teams still have an equal ranking, the same criteria will be reapplied to determine the final ranking of the two teams. If this procedure does not lead to a decision, the following criteria will apply:
Results of all group matches:
Superior goal difference
Higher number of goals scored
Fair play ranking of the teams in question
Drawing of lots
If two teams which have the same number of points and the same number of goals scored and conceded play their last group match against each other and are still equal at the end of that match, their final rankings will be determined by kicks from the penalty mark and not by the criteria listed above

All times are Eastern European Summer Time (UTC+3)

Group A

Group B

The match was scheduled to be played on 20 July, but was abandoned after 15 minutes due to adverse weather conditions while Spain was leading 1–0 after a goal from Álvaro Morata. It was replayed on 21 July at 18:00 local time.

Knockout stage

Bracket

Semifinals

Final

Goalscorers 
6 goals
 Álvaro Morata

3 goals

 Tomáš Přikryl
 Paco Alcácer

2 goals

 Tomáš Jeleček
 Patrik Lácha
 Anthony O'Connor
 Djordje Despotović
 Juanmi
 Pablo Sarabia

1 goal

 Florent Cuvelier
 Marnick Vermijl
 Jonas Vervaeke
 Jakub Brabec
 Adam Jánoš
 Tomáš Kalas
 Ladislav Krejčí
 Jiří Skalák
 Kostas Fortounis
 Giorgos Katidis
 John O'Sullivan
 Nicolae Stanciu
 Miloš Jojić
 Andrej Mrkela
 Nikola Trujić
 Jon Aurtenetxe
 Gerard Deulofeu
 Juan Muñiz
 Kamil Çörekçi
 Ali Dere

1 own goal

 Sergi Gómez (playing against Turkey)
 Jonás Ramalho (playing against Turkey)

Team of the Tournament
After the final, the UEFA technical team selected 23 players to integrate the "team of the tournament".

Goalkeepers
  Tomáš Koubek
  Stefanos Kapino
  Édgar Badía

Defenders
  Pierre-Yves Ngawa
  Jakub Brabec
  Tomáš Jeleček
  Tomáš Kalas
  Dani Carvajal
  Sergi Gómez
  Ignasi Miquel

Midfielders
  Adam Jánoš
  Pavel Kadeřábek
  Ladislav Krejčí
  Kostas Fortounis
  Jeffrey Hendrick
  Rubén Pardo
  Pablo Sarabia
  Orhan Gülle

Forwards
  Tomáš Přikryl
  Charis Mavrias
  Ionuț Năstăsie
  Andrej Mrkela
  Paco Alcácer
  Gerard Deulofeu
  Álvaro Morata

References

External links 
 UEFA.com

 
2011
2010–11 in Romanian football
U
International association football competitions hosted by Romania
July 2011 sports events in Europe
August 2011 sports events in Europe
2011 in youth association football